Mohammed Abdullah Salem (born 6 August 1985) is a Saudi football player, who plays as defender for Al-Raed.

References

External links 
 

1985 births
Living people
Saudi Arabian footballers
Al-Faisaly FC players
Ittihad FC players
Al-Jabalain FC players
Al-Qadsiah FC players
Al-Shabab FC (Riyadh) players
Al-Raed FC players
Saudi Professional League players
Saudi First Division League players
Association football defenders